Mont-Notre-Dame is a commune in the Aisne department located in Hauts-de-France, Northern France.

Population

See also
Communes of the Aisne department

References

Communes of Aisne
Aisne communes articles needing translation from French Wikipedia